Byarozawka or Beryozovka is a city in Grodno Region, Belarus. As of 2015, it had a population of 10,533 inhabitants. It is situated along the Neman River.

The Polish football manager Czesław Michniewicz and the Belarusian musician Zmitser Vaitsyushkevich were born here.

References

External links

Beryozovka portal at regiony.by

Populated places in Grodno Region
Cities in Belarus